Albert Montañés was the defending champion, but was defeated 1–6, 3–6 by Juan Ignacio Chela in the semifinals.
Chela went on to win the tournament, defeating qualifier Pablo Andújar 7–5, 6–1 in the final.

Seeds

Main draw

Finals

Top half

Bottom half

Qualifying

Seeds

Qualifiers

Lucky loser

Draw

First qualifier

Second qualifier

Third qualifier

Fourth qualifier

References
 Main Draw
 Qualifying Draw

Romanian Open
Bcr Open Romania - Singles